B. Jill Venton is a professor of chemistry at University of Virginia, where she serves as the department chair since 2019. Venton's research focuses on developing analytical chemistry methods to enable detection of molecules in the brain.

Education 
Venton received her BS in Chemistry from University of Delaware in 1998 and her PhD in Chemistry from University of North Carolina, Chapel Hill in 2003. She was an NIH postdoctoral fellow at University of Michigan from 2003 to 2005.

Research 
Venton joined the Department of Chemistry at University of Virginia as an assistant professor in 2005, received tenure and was promoted to an associate professor in 2011, and was promoted to full professor in 2016. Venton develops analytical tools such as carbon-fiber microelectrodes for sensing molecules in the brain to achieve real-time monitoring of neurotransmitters to help understand the brain functions both under normal physiological conditions and in neurological disorders.

Awards and honors 

 National Science Foundation Career Award, 2007–2012
 Meade Endowment Honored Faculty, 2007–2008
 Eli Lilly Young Analytical Investigator Award, 2007
 American Chemical Society PROGRESS/Dreyfus Foundation Lectureship, 2008
 Camille Dreyfus Teacher-Scholar, 2010
 Society for Electroanalytical Chemistry, Young Investigator Award, 2011
 President Elect, International Society of Monitoring Molecules in vivo, 2018–2022
 Distinguished Researcher Award, American Chemical Society Virginia Section, 2020

Selected publications

References

External links 

Women chemists
University of Virginia faculty

Year of birth missing (living people)
Living people
University of Delaware alumni
University of North Carolina alumni
University of Michigan faculty
Analytical chemists
21st-century American chemists